Wild and Peaceful is the fourth studio album, and sixth album of new material released by the funk band Kool & the Gang, and is their commercial breakthrough album. It was released in 1973 and was hugely successful on the Billboard R&B chart, reaching No. 6 and charting for 36 weeks. It also reached No. 33 on the Pop charts, making it the band's first entry into that chart's Top 40. The album spawned the band's first three Top 10 singles. "Funky Stuff" reached No. 5 R&B/No. 29 Pop. The hugely popular track "Jungle Boogie" soared to No. 2 R&B and No. 4 on the Billboard Hot 100, and "Hollywood Swinging" topped the Billboard Hot Soul Singles in June 1974 while reaching No. 6 Pop. The latter two singles both sold over a million copies and were certified Gold by the RIAA. The album itself was also certified Gold.

Track listing

Personnel
 Robert "Kool" Bell – bass, vocals
 George "Funky" Brown – drums, percussion, vocals 
 Ricky West – electric piano, vocals
 Clay Smith – lead guitar
 Dennis "D.T." Thomas – alto saxophone, flute, congas, vocals
 Ronald Bell – tenor and soprano saxophones, vocals
 Robert "Spike" Mickens – trumpet, vocals

Additional personnel 
 Don Boyce – backing vocals (3)
 Rory Bell – backing vocals (4)
 Tomorrow’s Edition (Jerome Gourdine, Aaron Mathis and Wesley Thomas) – backing vocals (6)

Production
 Produced and Arranged by Kool & The Gang
 Engineers – Harvey Goldberg and Jeff Lesser
 Recorded at MediaSound Studios (New York, NY).
 Cover Artwork – Joseph Askew 
 Album Design – Richard Askew

Certifications

References

External links

Kool & the Gang albums
1973 albums
De-Lite Records albums